Avon Valley may refer to:

 Avon Valley, Western Australia (disambiguation)

 The valley formed by the River Avon in Bristol
Avon Valley Railway, a heritage railway
Avon Valley Country Park

 The valley formed by the River Avon in Hampshire
Avon Valley Academy, a secondary school and sixth form in Durrington, Wiltshire
Avon Valley Path, a long-distance path
Avon Valley (Bickton to Christchurch), a nature reserve

The valley formed by the River Avon in Warwickshire
Avon Valley School and Performing Arts College, in Rugby, Warwickshire